The Illinois Fighting Illini women's volleyball is the NCAA Division I intercollegiate volleyball program of the University of Illinois at Urbana–Champaign, often referred to as "Illinois", located in Champaign, Illinois. The Illinois volleyball team competes in the Big Ten Conference and has played their home games in Huff Hall since 1990. Since moving into Huff Hall from the Kenney Gym, Illinois Volleyball has remained in the top 10 in the nation for average home attendance. In 2013, the program broke its previous home attendance record, averaging 3,117 per match.

History
Since the founding of the volleyball program in 1974, the Fighting Illini have had 39 winning seasons.

Head coaching history

 Big Ten Conference volleyball did not begin play until 1982.

Attendance records

Season results

See also
 List of NCAA Division I women's volleyball programs

References

External links